Simon Crowe (born 14 April 1955, Dublin, Ireland) is an Irish musician, best known as the drummer and backing vocalist of the Irish new wave band 
The Boomtown Rats.

The original name of the Boomtown Rats was the "Nightlife Thugs". The name Boomtown Rats was taken from a novel entitled Bound for Glory by Woody Guthrie.

The Boomtown Rats had eighteen hit singles in the UK, including "Rat Trap" and "I Don't Like Mondays". Crowe has also been part of The Velcro Flies (with ex-Boomtown Rat Garry Roberts) and Gung~Ho (with ex-Boomtown Rat Johnny Fingers).

After the group disbanded, Crowe lived in Devon for some years where he played with the local folk and roots group Jiggerypipery.

The Boomtown Rats presently features Garry Roberts on guitar and Simon Crowe on drums, with the addition of Pete Briquette on bass, and Darren Beale on lead guitar.

References

Living people
1955 births
musicians from Dublin (city)
The Boomtown Rats members
Irish new wave musicians